b'lieve i'm goin down... is the sixth studio album by American indie rock musician Kurt Vile, released on September 25, 2015 on Matador Records. A deluxe edition, b'lieve i'm goin (deep) down..., featuring six additional tracks, was released on the same day.

Produced primarily by Vile and his bandmate Rob Laakso, the album was recorded in ten different recording studios, with sessions often taking place late at night.

Critical reception

B'lieve I'm Goin' Down... received widespread critical acclaim, gaining an aggregate of 83/100 on Metacritic, indicating universal acclaim  and garnered a 'Best New Music' title and was rated 8.4/10 in a review by Pitchfork.

Accolades

Track listing

Personnel
Adapted from AllMusic.

 Gary Burden – art direction, design
 Greg Calbi – mastering
 Henry Diltz – cover photo
 Steve Fallone – assistant
 Greg Giorgio – assistant
 Jenice Heo – art direction, design
 Tommy Joy – engineer
 Farrah Katina – photography
 Peter Katis – mixing
 Andy Kravitz – engineer
 Rob Laakso – bass, drums, engineer, guitar, acoustic guitar, electric guitar, mixing, percussion, photography, producer, strings, synthesizer
 Jenny Lee Lindberg – vocals, backing vocals
 Kevin Morbey – vocals, backing vocals
 Stella Mozgawa – drums, percussion, synthesizer, vibraphone, backing vocals
 Brian Rosemeyer – assistant, assistant engineer
 Colin Rothwell – assistant
 Genevieve Schatz – vocals, backing vocals
 Farmer Dave Scher – guitar, keyboards, backing vocals
 Rob Schnapf – engineer, mixing, producer
 Katherine Sheehan – photography
 Justin Smith – engineer
 Kyle Spence – drums, engineer, percussion, producer
 Creston Spiers – horn
 Jesse Trbovich – bass, electric guitar, photography
 Kurt Vile – banjo, engineer, farfisa organ, acoustic guitar, electric guitar, keyboards, mellotron, noise, photography, piano, primary artist, producer, resonator, strings, backing vocals, wurlitzer
 Paul Vile – vocals, backing vocals
 The Violators – producer
 Mike Zimmerman – layout

Charts

Weekly charts

Year-end charts

References

Kurt Vile albums
2015 albums
Matador Records albums